The 2000–01 Euroleague Women was the fifth edition of the Euroleague era of FIBA's premier international competition for European women's basketball clubs, running between 1 November 2000 and 22 April 2001. CJM Bourges Basket defeated US Valenciennes Olympic in the first final between two teams from the same country since 1962 to win its third title.

Qualification round

Group A

Group B

Group C

Group H

Eight-finals

Quarter-finals

Final four
 Messina, Italy

References

EuroLeague Women seasons